Kwiatkowice may refer to:

Kwiatkowice, Lower Silesian Voivodeship (south-west Poland)
Kwiatkowice, Łódź Voivodeship (central Poland)
Kwiatkowice, Lubusz Voivodeship (west Poland)

See also
Kwiatkowice-Kolonia